Eels with Strings: Live at Town Hall is a live album by Eels, released on CD and DVD on February 20, 2006 in the United Kingdom and the following day in the United States. The recording is from New York City's Town Hall, June 30, 2005. It is the first live Eels album with a general release, and the first Eels DVD.

CD track listing
All songs written by E, except where noted:
"Blinking Lights (For Me)" – 2:03
"Bride of Theme from Blinking Lights" – 1:36
"Bus Stop Boxer" (E, John Parish) – 3:24
"Dirty Girl" – 2:53
"Trouble with Dreams" – 3:21
"The Only Thing I Care About" (E, Parthenon Huxley) – 2:14
"My Beloved Monster" – 1:53
"Pretty Ballerina" (Michael Brown) – 2:35
"It's a Motherfucker" – 2:15
"Flyswatter" – 5:02
"Novocaine for the Soul" (E, Mark Goldenberg) – 3:06
"Girl from the North Country" (Bob Dylan) – 2:49
"Railroad Man" – 2:28
"I Like Birds" – 2:30
"If You See Natalie" – 3:30
"Poor Side of Town" (Lou Adler, Johnny Rivers) – 2:44
"Spunky" – 3:04
"I'm Going to Stop Pretending that I Didn't Break Your Heart" – 3:45
"Suicide Life" – 2:39
"Losing Streak" – 2:17
"Hey Man (Now You're Really Living)" – 2:17
"Things the Grandchildren Should Know" – 4:54

iTunes bonus tracks
The Internet-only release on iTunes also includes three bonus tracks:
"Mr. E's Beautiful Blues" (E, Michael Simpson) – 3:05
"Living Life" (Daniel Johnston) – 2:35
"I Could Never Take the Place of Your Man" (Prince) – 3:38

DVD track listing
I Heart NY
"Theme from Blinking Lights"
"Going to Your Funeral Part 2" (E and Jim Jacobsen) – 1:53
"Dust of Ages" (E and Jacobsen) – 2:06
"In the Yard, Behind the Church" – 3:12
Ladies of EELS
"Bride of Theme from Blinking Lights" – 1:36
"From Which I Came/A Magic World" – 2:12
The Chet
"Son of a Bitch" (E and Jim Lang) – 2:29
"Blinking Lights (For Me)" – 2:03
Big Al
"Dirty Girl" – 2:53
"My Beloved Monster" – 1:53
On the Road
"The Only Thing I Care About" (E and Huxley) – 2:14
"Bus Stop Boxer" (E and Parish) – 3:24
"Pretty Ballerina" (Brown) – 2:35
E on the A
"I Like Birds" – 2:30
"Girl from the North Country" (Dylan) – 2:49
The Late EELS
"Railroad Man" – 2:28
"Trouble with Dreams" – 3:21
Backstage Tomfoolery
"If You See Natalie" – 3:30
"I'm Going to Stop Pretending that I Didn't Break Your Heart" – 3:45
"Dead of Winter" – 3:03
Groupies
"Flyswatter" – 5:02
"Novocaine for the Soul" (E and Mark Goldenberg) – 3:06
"Losing Streak" – 2:17
"The Stars Shine in the Sky Tonight" (E and Lang) – 3:06
"Souljacker Part 2" (E and Lang) – 1:29
E Is Lost
"Hey Man (Now You're Really Living)" – 2:17
"Things the Grandchildren Should Know" – 4:54
"Dog Faced Boy" (E and Parish) – 3:09
The Adulation of Thousands
Emergency Commentary (played over Prince's "I Could Never Take the Place of Your Man")
"Mr. E's Beautiful Blues" (E and Simpson) – 3:05
"Blinking Lights (For You)"

Bonus features
Four behind-the-scenes documentary segments (Cribs, Bobby Jr., Boring, and Another Day at the Office), music videos for "Hey Man (Now You're Really Living)", and "Trouble with Dreams."

Personnel

Eels
Big Al – upright bass, autoharp, keyboards, and melodica
Julie – violin, mandolin, and percussion
The Chet – trash can, suitcase, saw, lap steel guitar, guitar, mandolin, melodica, keyboards, and upright bass
E – vocals, guitar, and keyboards
Ana Lenchantin – cello, percussion, and vibrator
Heather Lockie – viola and percussion
Paloma Udovic – violin and percussion

Technical personnel
Niels Alpert – still photography
Paul Brainard – string arrangement
Jim Lang – string arrangement
Koool G Murder – string  arrangement
Wendy Peyton – cover photo

Compact Disc
Dan Hersch – mastering
Douglas Trantow – mixing

DVD
Adamocrea – Puklepop clip
Niels Alpert – direction and editing
John Chaisson – production
Lucy DiLorenzo – production coordination
Jesse Dylan – direction on "Trouble with Dreams"
Caleb Heineman – location sound mixing
Jake Oelman – editing
Josh Levy – audio mixing
Douglas Trantow – music mixing

References

External links
Official website
Entire film streaming at Vimeo
Vagrant Records' promotional mini-site for the album

Eels (band) video albums
Eels (band) live albums
Live video albums
2006 live albums
2006 video albums
Vagrant Records live albums
Vagrant Records video albums
Albums produced by Mark Oliver Everett
Albums recorded at the Town Hall